The 2020 Oracle Challenger Series – Indian Wells was a professional tennis tournament played on outdoor hard courts. It was the third edition of the tournament, and part of the 2020 ATP Challenger Tour and the 2020 WTA 125K series. It took place from March 2–8, 2020 in Indian Wells, United States.

Point distribution

Men's singles main-draw entrants

Seeds

 1 Rankings are as of 24 February 2020.

Other entrants
The following players received wildcards into the singles main draw:
  Radu Albot
  Brandon Holt
  Ugo Humbert
  Govind Nanda
  Keegan Smith

The following players received entry into the singles main draw using protected rankings:
  Blake Mott
  Raymond Sarmiento
  Jack Sock

The following player received entry into the singles main draw as an alternate:
  Romain Arneodo

The following players received entry from the qualifying draw:
  Gage Brymer
  Sem Verbeek

Women's singles main-draw entrants

Seeds

 1 Rankings are as of 24 February 2019.

Other entrants
The following players received wildcards into the singles main draw:
  Hailey Baptiste
  Claire Liu
  Jamie Loeb
  CoCo Vandeweghe

The following players received entry into the singles main draw using protected rankings:
  Mona Barthel
  Katie Boulter
  Irina Falconi
  Vera Zvonareva

The following players received entry from the qualifying draw:
  Danielle Lao
  Asia Muhammad

Withdrawals
Before the tournament
  Allie Kiick → replaced by  Sachia Vickery
  Whitney Osuigwe → replaced by  Verónica Cepede Royg

During the tournament
  Vera Zvonareva

Women's doubles main-draw entrants

Seeds 

 1 Rankings as of 24 February 2020

Other entrants 
The following pair received a wildcard into the doubles main draw:
  Hailey Baptiste /  Claire Liu

Champions

Men's singles

 Steve Johnson def.  Jack Sock 6–4, 6–4.

Women's singles

  Irina-Camelia Begu def.  Misaki Doi, 6–3, 6–3

Men's doubles

 Denis Kudla /  Thai-Son Kwiatkowski def.  Sebastian Korda /  Mitchell Krueger 6–3, 2–6, [10–6].

Women's doubles

  Asia Muhammad /  Taylor Townsend def.  Caty McNally /  Jessica Pegula, 6–4, 6–4

References

External links 
 Official website

2020
2020 ATP Challenger Tour
2020 WTA 125K series
2020 in American tennis
2020 in sports in California
March 2020 sports events in the United States